Troinka is a rural locality (a selo) in Dalny Selsoviet, Rubtsovsky District, Altai Krai, Russia. The population was 147 as of 2013. There are 2 streets.

Geography 
Troinka is located 46 km east of Rubtsovsk (the district's administrative centre) by road. Dalny is the nearest rural locality.

References 

Rural localities in Rubtsovsky District